Bruno Rubeo (26 October 1946 – 3 November 2011) was a production designer, known for his multiple collaborations with film directors Oliver Stone and Taylor Hackford.

Biography
He was nominated for an Academy Award in the category Best Art Direction for the film Driving Miss Daisy.

Rubeo died of pneumonia on 3 November 2011 at the city hospital in Foligno, Italy. He is survived by his wife Mayes C. Rubeo, a highly acclaimed costume designer, and a son, who is also an art director.

Selected filmography

References

External links

1946 births
2011 deaths
Italian production designers
Film people from Rome
Deaths from pneumonia in Umbria